Mecas rotundicollis is a species of longhorn beetles found in Central and southern North America. It was described by James Thomson in 1868.

References

Saperdini
Beetles described in 1868